Celebration, Florida, by The Felice Brothers, was released on May 10, 2011. The single "Ponzi", released on March 29, 2011, shows a departure from the group's past roots-rock albums with a new electro, dancehall sound.

Reception

Celebration, Florida received positive reviews from critics. On Metacritic, the album holds a score of 77 out of 100 based on 14 reviews, indicating "generally favorable reviews."

Track listing
"Fire at the Pageant" – 3:33
"Container Ship" – 4:16
"Honda Civic" – 3:27
"Oliver Stone" – 5:59
"Ponzi" – 5:19
"Back in the Dancehalls" – 3:34
"Dallas" – 4:01
"Cus’s Catskill Gym" – 3:53
"Refrain" – 3:16
"Best I Ever Had" – 4:00
"River Jordan" – 6:30

References

2011 albums
The Felice Brothers albums
Fat Possum Records albums
Loose Music albums